Waterfall Creek may refer to:

Creeks or streams

Australia 
Waterfall Creek in Royal National Park, New South Wales 
Waterfall Creek, tributary of Kowmung River, New South Wales 
Waterfall Creek, tributary of Fish River (Oberon), New South Wales 
Waterfall Creek in Waterfall Reserve of Mount Wilson, New South Wales 
Waterfall Creek, site of Gunlom Falls, Northern Territory 
Waterfall Creek in Hallett Cove Conservation Park, South Australia
Waterfall Creek in Western River Wilderness Protection Area, South Australia
Waterfall Creek, tributary of Bundara River, Victoria, Australia
 Several creeks in Western Australia, see List of watercourses in Western Australia, W–Z

United States
Waterfall Creek in Keystone Canyon, Alaska, US
Waterfall Creek, site of Douglas Falls, North Carolina, US

Other uses
 Site of a settlement for the Homeward Bound Battery and Dam, Queensland, Australia
 Waterfall Creek, homestead in the locality of Gilla, Queensland, Australia